Qiran may refer to:

 Iranian qiran, a currency of Iran between 1825 and 1932
 Qiran, Saudi Arabia, a village in Al Madinah Province